Omukama Nyamutukura Kyebambe III ruled Bunyoro (part of modern-day Uganda) from 1786–1835. In 1822, his eldest son rebelled and established his own independent kingdom, the Toro Kingdom.

References

Toro
Ugandan monarchies